American Flag usually refers to the national flag of the United States.

American Flag may also refer to:

American Flag, Arizona, a ghost town
American Flag (horse), a racehorse
Flag of the Organization of American States
Flags of the U.S. states and territories